Lääne-Harju Parish is a rural municipality in northern Estonia. It is a part of Harju County. The municipality has a population of 12,865 (as of 1 January 2019) and covers an area of 645.71 km².

The parish was formed as a result of the administrative reform in 2017 when four municipalities – Keila Parish, Padise Parish, Vasalemma Parish and the town of Paldiski – were merged to become Lääne-Harju Parish.

The current mayor is Jaanus Saat (since the formation in 2017).

Settlements

There are 1 town, 6 small boroughs and 46 villages in Lääne-Harju Parish.

Administrative centre of the municipality is Paldiski, a town.

The small boroughs are Ämari, Karjaküla, Keila-Joa, Klooga, Rummu and Vasalemma.

The rest of the settlements are villages: Alliklepa, Altküla, Änglema, Audevälja, Harju-Risti, Hatu, Illurma, Karilepa, Kasepere, Keelva, Keibu, Kersalu, Kloogaranna, Kobru, Kulna, Kurkse, Kõmmaste, Käesalu, Laane, Langa, Laoküla, Laulasmaa, Lehola, Lemmaru, Lohusalu, Madise, Maeru, Meremõisa, Merenuka, Metslõugu, Määra, Nahkjala, Niitvälja, Ohtu, Padise, Pae, Pedase, Põllküla, Suurküla, Tuulna, Tõmmiku, Valkse, Veskiküla, Vihterpalu, Vilivalla, Vintse.

Religion

References

External links
Official website (available only in Estonian)